Pierre Bobo (29 November 1902 – 7 July 1971) was a French racing cyclist. He rode in the 1929 Tour de France.

References

1902 births
1971 deaths
French male cyclists
Place of birth missing